The List of regional rail lines in North Rhine-Westphalia provides a list of all Regional-Express and Regionalbahn railway lines in North Rhine-Westphalia. The passenger rail service in North Rhine-Westphalia is one of the densest train services in Germany, comprising 100 million train kilometers and is mainly operated on an integrated timetable, which has been in effect since 1998 with the introduction its current version, known as 1998 NRW-Takt.

Timetable
The examples of the NRW integrated timetable given here are solely to illustrate the system. They do not include the regional rail to tram and railway lines. Pure tram routes are consequently not included in this list. Current information can be obtained from the responsible transport associations (VRR and VRS).

The timetable is predominantly based on zero symmetry. Concretely, this means that the trains on the lines with hourly service meet on the minutes :59 and :29, on the lines with service every two hours just at the minute :59. The departure times of the opposite direction are calculated by mirroring the arrival times at the minute :58.5.

All the lines provide connections to hub stations and their connection with local transport.

Some lines are interconnected, for example the RB 71 with the RB 73 or the RB 67 with the RE 82.

Regional-Express and Regionalbahn lines
Lines in which the state of North Rhine-Westphalia has determined to be in the public interest and necessity are ordered and supported by the state. These are shown with a yellow background.

The specified sub-networks are the units through which the lines are awarded.

Lines 1–9
 Lines or sections with a frequency of less than 60 minutes, usually every 30 minutes, are written in bold.
 Lines or sections with a frequency of more than 60 minutes, usually every 120 minutes, are written in italics.
 Lines or sections outside North Rhine-Westphalia are written in small.

Lines 10–19
 Lines or sections with a frequency of less than 60 minutes, usually every 30 minutes, are written in bold.
 Lines or sections with a frequency of more than 60 minutes, usually every 120 minutes, are written in italics.
 Lines or sections outside North Rhine-Westphalia are written in small.

Lines 20–29
 Lines or sections with a frequency of less than 60 minutes, usually every 30 minutes, are written in bold.
 Lines or sections with a frequency of more than 60 minutes, usually every 120 minutes, are written in italics.
 Lines or sections outside North Rhine-Westphalia are written in small.

Lines 30–39
 Lines or sections with a frequency of less than 60 minutes, usually every 30 minutes, are written in bold.
 Lines or sections with a frequency of more than 60 minutes, usually every 120 minutes, are written in italics.
 Lines or sections outside North Rhine-Westphalia are written in small.

Lines 40–49
 Lines or sections with a frequency of less than 60 minutes, usually every 30 minutes, are written in bold.
 Lines or sections with a frequency of more than 60 minutes, usually every 120 minutes, are written in italics.
 Lines or sections outside North Rhine-Westphalia are written in small.

Lines 50–59
 Lines or sections with a frequency of less than 60 minutes, usually every 30 minutes, are written in bold.
 Lines or sections with a frequency of more than 60 minutes, usually every 120 minutes, are written in italics.
 Lines or sections outside North Rhine-Westphalia are written in small.

Lines 60–69
 Lines or sections with a frequency of less than 60 minutes, usually every 30 minutes, are written in bold.
 Lines or sections with a frequency of more than 60 minutes, usually every 120 minutes, are written in italics.
 Lines or sections outside North Rhine-Westphalia are written in small.

Lines 70–79
 Lines or sections with a frequency of less than 60 minutes, usually every 30 minutes, are written in bold.
 Lines or sections with a frequency of more than 60 minutes, usually every 120 minutes, are written in italics.
 Lines or sections outside North Rhine-Westphalia are written in small.

Lines 80–89
 Lines or sections with a frequency of less than 60 minutes, usually every 30 minutes, are written in bold.
 Lines or sections with a frequency of more than 60 minutes, usually every 120 minutes, are written in italics.
 Lines or sections outside North Rhine-Westphalia are written in small.

Lines 90–99
 Lines or sections with a frequency of less than 60 minutes, usually every 30 minutes, are written in bold.
 Lines or sections with a frequency of more than 60 minutes, usually every 120 minutes, are written in italics.
 Lines or sections outside North Rhine-Westphalia are written in small.

S-Bahn services

S-Bahn Rhein-Ruhr(/Sieg)
as of December 2020

 The S-Bahn Lines operate on weekdays at 20 or 30-minute intervals and on weekends at 30-minute intervals.
 Lines or sections with a frequency of more than 20 minutes, usually at 10-minute intervals, are written in bold.
 Lines or sections with a frequency of less than 20 minutes, usually at 60-minute intervals, are written in italics.

The DB Regio NRW is the operator of all S-Bahn Rhein-Ruhr lines, with the exception of the S28, which is operated by Regiobahn GmbH and the S7 which are operated by Vias Rail.

[1] One train per hour to Recklinghausen and Essen.
[2] Extended to Köln-Worringen during the peak.
[3] Only during peak times, Wuppertal-Vohwinkel–Düsseldorf in direction of load.

Hanover S-Bahn in North Rhine-Westphalia
The Hanover S-Bahn is operated by DB Regio Nord. This list only includes lines that travel in North Rhine-Westphalia.

Stadtbahn Lines on the tracks of the HGK
Select Stadtbahn Lines of the Cologne Stadtbahn and the Bonn Stadtbahn use sections of the rail lines of the Häfen und Güterverkehr Köln railway. Within the cities of Cologne and Bonn these Lines are integrated in the Stadtbahn Rhein-Sieg.

 Lines sections with a frequency of more than 10 minutes, usually in 5-minute intervals, are written in bold.
 Lines sections with a frequency of less than 10 minutes, usually in 20-minute intervals, are written in italics.
 Sections that operate as a tram, are written smaller.

See also
 List of scheduled railway routes in Germany
 List of German transport associations

External links
 Fachportal Nahverkehr NRW des Ministeriums für Planen und Bauen des Landes Nordrhein - Westfalen
 LinesNetplan des Regionalverkehrs in NRW (PDF, 1,4 MB), Stand: Dezember 2007 
 [ NRW-Bahnarchiv]

References

Regional rail in Germany
Transport in North Rhine-Westphalia